In the period preceding the Municipal Reform of 1970, Denmark was divided into around 170 hundreds (Danish: herred, plural: herreder). In the timeframe 1793 through 1970, each parish was functioning as a municipality within their respective hundreds. The hundreds were in turn part of a county. This was changed in 1970, when the parishes were merged into larger municipalities sometimes crossing hundred borders, and the hundreds fell out of administrative use.

Today, hundreds are used mostly for purposes of genealogy research.

Detail

Denmark was subdivided into hundreds from the early medieval period until this administrative division was finally abolished as part of the 1970 administrative reform.

Hundreds comprised varying numbers of parishes (Danish: sogn, plural: sogne), and each hundred had its own tingsted (assembly place) where the ting (assembly) was held, serving as court of law in minor affairs (major affairs were decided by the three landsting assemblies, serving as supreme courts in respectively 1) Scania [including Halland, Blekinge and Bornholm], 2) Zealand [including Lolland and Falster] and 3) Jutland and Funen). It has been hypothesised - since an extremely large amount of Denmark's herreder have access to the sea - that the division may have originated in the Viking era, for either offensive or defensive purposes. The subdivision applies to almost all parts of medieval Denmark (see below), including Southern Schleswig, Scania, Halland and Blekinge, but not Rügen.

Jutland (including Southern Schleswig) and most or all of Zealand were divided into syssel divisions (Danish: syssel, plural: sysler), each composed of a number of herreder, which in turn were subdivided into parishes. The syssel division did not apply in other parts of Denmark.

The area between the Danevirke fortifications and the river Eider (originally very sparsely populated) was exceptional in being included into the syssel divisions (as part of Istedsyssel) but was not subdivided into herreder. The area of North Frisian settlement Uthlande, now North Frisia, was subdivided into herreder which in turn were divided into parishes, but this region was not subject to Danish law but to a local Frisian law, and was in the medieval period administered as part of the royal demesne.

When Denmark in the 1660s abolished the former division into fiefs (Len), their replacement, the counties (amt, plural: amter) were similarly based on the herreder which in turn remained subdivided into parishes.

List

See also 
Danish municipal reforms of 1970 and of 2007
Other administrative units (current or historical) in Denmark, roughly in decreasing order of size:
Regions of Denmark
Counties of Denmark
Municipalities of Denmark
Market town#Denmark and Parish (Denmark)

References

 
Denmark geography-related lists